Christian Francois Schoeman (born 23 September 1991 in Pretoria, South Africa) is a South African rugby union player for Newcastle Falcons in Premiership Rugby. His regular position is fly-half.

Career

Youth

Despite not playing for them in 2011, he made a big impact during the 2012 Under-21 Provincial Championship, contributing 115 points for the  – third behind the s Fred Zeilinga and the s Marais Schmidt – to help the Blue Bulls clinch the title in this competition, scoring 14 points with the boot as they beat  22–13 in the final.

Varsity Cup

Schoeman represented university side  in the 2013 Varsity Cup competition, scoring 23 points in the first four rounds of the competition before Handré Pollard was given a chance for the latter rounds of the competition, which UP Tuks eventually went on to win. He was the first-choice fly-half throughout the 2014 Varsity Cup however, scoring 48 points in his seven appearances, but failing to help his side qualify for the quarter-finals.

Blue Bulls

At the conclusion of the 2014 Varsity Cup, he was included in the  2014 Vodacom Cup squad. He made his first class debut for them in their match against Gauteng rivals  and contributed 24 points to his side's 54–7 win, scoring a try and kicking five conversions and two penalties. Despite missing the first four rounds of the competition, he ended the competition in sixth place on the scorers list, contributing 60 points in five appearances.

His Currie Cup debut came during the 2014 Currie Cup Premier Division season, as he played off the bench in the second half of their match against . He kicked two late penalties but  that was not enough to stop the  go down 23–18.

Bordeaux

Schoeman joined Top 14 side  prior to the 2017–18 Top 14 season. He scored 42 points in 15 matches for the team in his only season at the club.

Cheetahs

Schoeman returned to South Africa to join the  prior to the 2018–19 Pro14, signing a contract with the Bloemfontein-based franchise until October 2020.

Bath
On 18 January 2021, it was confirmed that Schoeman had joined Premiership Rugby side Bath with immediate effect.

References

South African rugby union players
Living people
1991 births
Rugby union players from Pretoria
Rugby union fly-halves
Blue Bulls players
Bulls (rugby union) players
Union Bordeaux Bègles players
Free State Cheetahs players
Cheetahs (rugby union) players
Bath Rugby players